Hirer Shikal is a Bengali drama film directed by Murari Chakraborty. This film was released in 1988 in the banner of Tumpa films. The music of the film was scored by Rabin Banerjee.

Plot
It is a story of rivalry between two brothers for their family diamonds. One brother hired an imposter lady and send her to another brother's house. Because she is look alike of their daughter Krishna. The parents can not realise that she is not their daughter and they not only gift her those diamonds but also fix her marriage. When the imposter lady tries to steal and escapes, she is caught and confesses the whole story to everyone.

Cast
 Chiranjeet Chakraborty
 Debashree Roy
 Biplab Chatterjee
 Madhabi Mukherjee
 Shekhar Chatterjee
 Gita Dey
 Kajal Gupta 
 Satya Banerjee

References

External links
 

1988 films
Bengali-language Indian films
Indian drama films
1988 drama films
1980s Bengali-language films